Miklós Németh (born 7 April 1946 in Budapest) is an association football forward.

Career
He earned one bronze and four silver medals in the Hungarian Football League between 1964 and 1972. He played on 105 matches in the colours of Fradi (59 champion matches, 33 international, 13 domestic fee matches) and he scored 61 goals (27 of them on championship matches and 34 other occasions).

Honours
 Nemzeti Bajnokság I
 2.: 1965, 1966, 1970-tavasz, 1970–71
 3.: 1969
 Magyar Kupa (MNK)
 winner: 1972

References
 
 Nagy Béla: Fradisták (Sportpropaganda, 1981) 

1946 births
Living people
Hungarian footballers
Association football forwards
Ferencvárosi TC footballers
People from Zugló
Footballers from Budapest